Elliott Browne (born 1997) is a British trampoline gymnast. Browne was part of the gold medal winning tumbling team at the 2019 World Championships in Tokyo, where he also won an individual silver medal.

References

1997 births
Living people
British male trampolinists
Medalists at the Trampoline Gymnastics World Championships
21st-century British people